Toledo is an unincorporated community in Charlton County, in the U.S. state of Georgia.

History
A post office called Toledo was established in 1895, and remained in operation until 1930. The community's name is a transfer from Toledo, Spain but is pronounced "Toe-lay'-do".

References

Unincorporated communities in Georgia (U.S. state)
Unincorporated communities in Charlton County, Georgia